Max Heinrich Maurenbrecher (17 July 1874 – 30 April 1929) was a German publicist, pastor and politician. He served as a pastor in the Evangelical State Church of Prussia's older Provinces until 1907. From 1909 to 1916, he preached for the free religious congregations in Nuremberg and Mannheim. In 1917 he rejoined the evangelical church and became a minister in Dresden.

Life
Originally a member of the Christian Social Party, he left that party in 1899 and became one of the leading members of Friedrich Naumann's National-Social Association, a party that sought to challenge the Social Democrats by addressing class inequity from a Protestant, non-Marxist perspective; the party succeeded in winning only one seat in the Reichstag, in 1903, before dissolving. Maurenbrecher then became a member of that party's rival, the Social Democratic Party. He left the SPD in 1916 in a dispute over increasing the military budget, joined the conservative German Fatherland Party in 1917, and finally joined the German National People's Party after the war.

Maurenbrecher was an admirer of Friedrich Nietzsche, who greatly influenced his thinking.

Bibliography
Goethe und die Juden (Goethe and the Jews),  1921, Ernst Boepple's Deutscher Volskverlag.

See also
Evangelical Social Congress (for which Maurenbrecher was a secretary)

References

1874 births
1930 deaths
Clergy from Königsberg
People from the Province of Prussia
German Calvinist and Reformed ministers
Christian Social Party (Germany) politicians
National-Social Association politicians
Social Democratic Party of Germany politicians
German Fatherland Party politicians
German National People's Party politicians
Alldeutscher Verband members